Girón  is the official Cuban newspaper of the provincial committee of the Cuban Communist Party in Matanzas. It is published in Spanish.

References

External links
 Girón online 

Mass media in Matanzas
Newspapers published in Cuba
Publications with year of establishment missing